Malacologia is a peer-reviewed scientific journal in the field of malacology, the study of mollusks. The journal publishes articles in the fields of molluscan systematics, ecology, population ecology, genetics, molecular genetics, evolution, and phylogenetics.

The journal specializes in publishing long papers and monographs. The journal publishes at least one, sometimes two, volumes of about 400 pages per year, which may consist of 1 or 2 issues. According to the Journal Citation Reports, its 2019 impact factor is 13.5. This ranks Malacologia 1st out of 145 listed journals in the category "Zoology". The journal started publication in 1962.

See also
Archiv für Molluskenkunde
Basteria
Journal of Conchology
Journal of Molluscan Studies
The Nautilus

References

External links 
 

Malacology journals
Publications established in 1962
English-language journals
Irregular journals